YKO or yko may refer to:

 YKO, the IATA code for Hakkari–Yüksekova Airport, Yüksekova, Turkey
 yko, the ISO 639-3 code for Yasa language, Cameroon and Equatorial Guinea, Gabon